Hukkeri is one of the 224 constituencies in the Karnataka Legislative Assembly of Karnataka a south state of India. Hukkeri is also part of Chikkodi Lok Sabha constituency.

Members of Legislative Assembly
Source

^ denotes by-elections

Election candidate

2022

Election results

2018

See also
 Hukkeri
 Belagavi district
 Chikkodi Lok Sabha constituency
 List of constituencies of Karnataka Legislative Assembly

References

 

Assembly constituencies of Karnataka
Belagavi district